Atsuhiko Yoshida (吉田敦彦, born 22 December 1934) is a Japanese classical scholar best known for his research on parallels between Indo-European and Japanese mythology.

Biography
Atsuhiko Yoshida was born on 22 December 1934. He received his degrees in classical studies at Seikei University and the University of Tokyo. Yoshida subsequently researched at the French National Centre for Scientific Research, where he came under the influence of Georges Dumézil. He subsequently worked as a visiting lecturer at the University of Geneva and the University of California, Los Angeles. Returning to Japan, Yoshida became a professor at Seikei University. He subsequently became a professor at Gakushuin University. Yoshida retired as professor emeritus in 2006. 

With  and C. Scott Littleton, Yoshida has conducted pioneering studies in relations between Indo-European (particularly Greek) and Japanese mythology. He was awarded the Order of the Sacred Treasure in 2013.

See also
 Jaan Puhvel
 Stig Wikander
 Edgar C. Polomé

1934 births
Indo-Europeanists
Japanese classical scholars
Living people
Mythographers
University of Tokyo alumni
Academic staff of Gakushuin University
Academic staff of Seikei University